Butta Créame was an American R&B Duo originally of Malika Jean as ("ButtaFly") and Sade Matthews ("ButtaBaby"). Later becoming a quartet then consisting of Joann Cuffee ("Buttafly"), Amber Lewis ("Hot Butta"),Alisa Mullins ("Butta Baby") 
and Kenya Small ("Cocoa Butta"). They are protégés of the group Pretty Ricky.

The group made their debut in 2007 on BET's "106 & Park" as Sweet Dreams. They appeared on Pretty Ricky's album Late Night Special, which was #1 on Billboard's hip-hop chart for 5 consecutive weeks.
Featured song named "So Confused"
In 2008, the group landed a record deal with Bluestar Records. They recorded "Cuddle Up" for Pretty Ricky's album 80's Babies and appeared in the video.

Discography

Singles
2006: "So Confused" (feat. Pretty Ricky) 
2007: "Wet Dreams" (feat. Pretty Ricky) 
2008: "Cuddle Up" (feat. Pretty Ricky)
2008: "4play" (feat. Pretty Ricky)
2008: "How Long (On & On)" (feat. Pretty Ricky)
2008: "Sugar Daddy" (feat. Diamond Blue of Pretty Ricky)
2008: "Just a Crush"
2008: "Karma"
2008: "Always on My Mind"
2008: "You Don't Know"
2009: "Next to You"

External links
Official site
Butta Creame on MySpace
https://web.archive.org/web/20090112061235/http://community.prettyricky.com/forum/topics/butta-creame-the-voices-of
http://showhype.com/video/pretty_ricky_feat_butta_creame_cuddle_up/
https://www.youtube.com/watch?v=olqShiFS3Mk
https://web.archive.org/web/20081227120307/http://www.bet.com/OnTV/BETShows/106andpark/PrettyRicky_JenniferHudson.htm
http://www.vibe.com/community/?L=blogs.blog&article=1565

American contemporary R&B musical groups
American girl groups